The Hibernia Gravity Base Structure is an offshore oil platform on the Hibernia oilfield southeast of St. John's, Newfoundland, Canada. 

This GBS is designed to resist iceberg forces and supports a topsides weighing 39,000 tonnes at towout, increasing to 58,000 tonnes in operation. There were significant challenges faced by the engineering firms Doris Development Canada, Morrison Hershfield and Mobil Technology in developing a structural solution with adequate strength which was also constructible. In addition, unusual design situations resulted from the construction methods and the structural components used.

Construction
The majority of the construction was performed at a site in Bull Arm, Trinity Bay, Newfoundland and Labrador. A new community housing 3,500 workers was constructed, with its own cafeteria, gym and entertainment facilities.

Many of the topsides modules were constructed locally, with some sourced internationally. The 550,000-ton slipform concrete GBS was built inside a drydock and mated with the topsides in the nearby deepwater construction site. Kiewit performed outfitting of equipment inside utility shafts and provided construction management services for the gravity base structure.

The assembled GBS was towed out on May 23, 1997, and installed in position on June 5. First oil was produced on November 17, 1997, four weeks ahead of schedule.

References

External links
Hibernia Gravity Base Structure

Oil platforms off Canada
Buildings and structures in Newfoundland and Labrador